B78 or B-78 may refer to:
 Obdacher Straße, a road in Austria
 B-78 Jupiter, a missile
 Sicilian Defense, Dragon Variation, according to the Encyclopaedia of Chess Openings
 Tamworth, according to the list of postal districts in the United Kingdom
 HLA-B78, an HLA-B serotype